Detrital zircon geochronology is the science of analyzing the age of zircons deposited within a specific sedimentary unit by examining their inherent radioisotopes, most commonly the uranium–lead ratio. Zircon is a common accessory or trace mineral constituent of most granite and felsic igneous rocks. Due to its hardness, durability and chemical inertness, zircon persists in sedimentary deposits and is a common constituent of most sands. Zircons contain trace amounts of uranium and thorium and can be dated using several modern analytical techniques.

Detrital zircon geochronology has become increasingly popular in geological studies from the 2000s mainly due to the advancement in radiometric dating techniques. Detrital zircon age data can be used to constrain the maximum depositional age, determine provenance, and reconstruct the tectonic setting on a regional scale.

Detrital zircon

Origin 
Detrital zircons are part of the sediment derived from weathering and erosion of pre-existing rocks. Since zircons are heavy and highly resistant at Earth's surface, many zircons are transported, deposited and preserved as detrital zircon grains in sedimentary rocks.

Properties 
Detrital zircons usually retain similar properties as their parent igneous rocks, such as age, rough size and mineral chemistry. However, the composition of detrital zircons is not entirely controlled by the crystallization of the zircon mineral. In fact, many of them are modified by later processes in the sedimentary cycle. Depending on the degree of physical sorting, mechanical abrasion and dissolution, a detrital zircon grain may lose some of its inherent features and gain some over-printed properties like rounded shape and smaller size.  On a larger scale, two or more tribes of detrital zircons from different origins may deposit within the same sedimentary basin. This give rise to a natural complexity of associating detrital zircon populations and their sources.

Zircon is a strong tool for uranium-lead age determination because of its inherent properties:
 Zircon contains high amount of uranium for machine recognition, commonly 100–1000 ppm.
 Zircon has a low amount of lead during crystallization, in parts per trillion. Thus, lead found in zircon can be assumed as daughter nuclei from parent uranium.
 Zircon crystals grow between 600 and 1100 °C, while lead is retained within the crystal structure below 800 °C (see Closure temperature). So once zircon has cooled below 800 °C it retains all the lead from the radioactive decay. Therefore, U-Pb age can be treated as the age of crystallization, if the mineral/sample itself has not undergone high temperature metamorphism after formation.
 Zircon commonly crystallizes in felsic igneous rocks,  with greater than 60% silica (SiO2) content. These rocks are generally less dense and more buoyant. They sit high in the Earth's (continental crust), and have good preservation potential.
 Zircon is physically and chemically resistant, so it is more likely to be preserved in the sedimentary cycle.
 Zircon contains other elements which gives supplementary information, such as hafnium (Hf), uranium/thorium (U/Th) ratio.

Sample collection 
There are no set rules for sample selection in detrital zircon geochronology studies. The objective and scale of the research project govern the type and number of samples taken. In some cases, the sedimentary rock type and depositional setting can significantly affect the result. Examples include:
 Matured quartz arenite within Vlamy Formation yield older and more diverse ages given by well-rounded detrital zircons, which may correlate to multiple sedimentary reworking events. On the contrary, Harmony Formation in the same region has younger and homogenous ages given by euhedral detrital zircons. These two formations illustrate the possibility of relating sedimentary maturity with resulting zircon ages, meaning that rounded and well-sorted sedimentary rocks (e.g. siltstone and mudstone) may have older and more diverse ages.
 Turbidites in Harts Pass Formation contain homogenous detrital zircons ages. On the other hand, fluvial Winthrop Formation in another strata of the same basin has various detrital zircon age populations. Comparing the vertical detrital zircon distribution within these two formations, one can expect a narrower age population of detrital zircons from rocks which are rapidly deposited, such as turbidites. Rocks that are gradually deposited (e.g. marine mudstone), however, have a greater chance and time to incorporate zircon sediments from different localities.

Detrital zircon extraction 
After rock samples are collected, they are cleaned, chipped, crushed and milled through standardized procedures. Then, detrital zircons are separated from the fine rock powder by three different ways, namely gravity separation using water, magnetic separation, and gravity separation using heavy liquid. In the process, grains are also sieved according to their size. The commonly used grain size for detrital zircon provenance analysis is 63–125 μm, which is equivalent to fine sand grain size.

Type of detrital zircon analysis 
There are two main types of detrital zircon analysis: qualitative analysis and quantitative analysis. The biggest advantage of qualitative analysis is being able to uncover all possible origin of the sedimentary unit, whereas quantitative analysis should allow meaningful comparison of proportions in the sample.

Qualitative analysis 
Qualitative approach examines all the available detrital zircons individually regardless of their abundance among all grains. This approach is usually conducted with high precision thermal ionization mass spectrometry (TIMS) and sometimes secondary ion mass spectrometry (SIMS). Optical examination and classification of detrital zircon grains are commonly included in qualitative studies through back-scatter electrons (BSE) or cathodoluminescence (CL) imagery, despite the relationship between the age and optical classification of detrital zircon grains is not always reliable.

Quantitative analysis 
Quantitative approach requires large number of grain analyses within a sample rock in order to represent the overall detrital zircon population statistically (i.e. the total number of analyses should achieve an appropriate level of confidence). Because of the large sample size, secondary ion mass spectrometry (SIMS) and laser ablation-inductively coupled plasma mass spectrometry (LA-ICPMS) are used instead of thermal ionization mass spectrometry (TIMS). In this case, BSE and CL imagery are applied to select the best spot on a zircon grain for acquiring reliable age.

Methods 
Different methods in detrital zircon analysis yield different results. Generally, researchers would include the methods/ analytical instruments they used within their studies. There are generally three categories, which are the instrument(s) used for zircon analysis, their calibration standards and instrument(s) used for zircon imagery. Details are listed in Table 1.

Detrital zircon data 
Depending on the detrital zircon study, there should be different variables included for analysis. There are two main types of data, analyzed zircon data (quantifiable data and imagery/descriptive data), and sample (where they extract the zircon grains) data. Details are listed in Table 2.

Filtering detrital zircon data 
All data acquired first-hand should be cleansed before using to avoid error, normally by computer.

By U-Pb age discordance 
Before applying detrital zircon ages, they should be evaluated and screened accordingly. In most cases, data are compared with U-Pb Concordia graphically. For a large dataset, however, data with high U-Pb age discordance (>10 – 30%) are filtered out numerically. The acceptable discordance level is often adjusted with the age of the detrital zircon since older population should experience higher chances of alteration and project higher discordance. (See Uranium–lead dating)

By choosing the best age 
Because of the intrinsic uncertainties within the three yield U-Pb ages (207Pb/235U, 206Pb/238U and 207Pb/206Pb), the age at ~1.4 Ga has the poorest resolution. An overall consensus for age with higher accuracy is to adopt:
 207Pb/206Pb for ages older than 0.8 – 1.0 Ga
 206Pb/238U for ages younger than 0.8 – 1.0 Ga

By data clustering 
Given the possibility of concordant yet incorrect detrital zircon U-Pb ages associated with lead loss or inclusion of older components, some scientists apply data selection through clustering and comparing the ages. Three or more data overlapping within ±2σ uncertainty would be classified as a valid age population of a particular source origin.

By age uncertainty (±σ) 
There are no set limit for age uncertainty and the cut-off value varies with different precision requirement. Although excluding data with huge age uncertainty would enhance the overall zircon grain age accuracy, over elimination may lower overall research reliability (decrease in size of the database). The best practice would be to filter accordingly, i.e. setting the cut-off error to eliminate reasonable portion of the dataset (say <5% of the total ages available)

By applied analytical methods 
Depending on the required analytical accuracy, researchers may filter data via their analytical instruments. Generally, researchers use only the data from sensitive high-resolution ion microprobe (SHRIMP), inductively coupled plasma mass spectrometry (LA-ICPMS) and thermal ionization mass spectrometry (TIMS) because of their high precision (1–2%, 1–2% and 0.1% respectively) in spot analysis. An older analytical technique, lead-lead evaporation, is no longer used since it cannot determine the U-Pb concordance of the age data.

By spot nature 
Apart from analytical methods, researchers would isolate core or rim ages for analysis. Normally, core ages would be used as crystallization age as they are first generated and least disturbed part in zircon grains. On the other hand, rim ages can be used to track peak metamorphism as they are first in contact with certain temperature and pressure condition. Researchers may utilize these different spot natures to reconstruct the geological history of a basin.

Application of detrital zircon ages

Maximum depositional age 
One of the most important information we can get from detrital zircon ages is the maximum depositional age of the referring sedimentary unit. The sedimentary unit cannot be older than the youngest age of the analyzed detrital zircons because the zircon should have existed before the rock formation. This provides useful age information to rock strata where fossils are unavailable, such as the terrestrial successions during Precambrian or pre-Devonian times. Practically, maximum depositional age is averaged from a cluster of youngest age data or the peak in age probability because the youngest U-Pb age within a sample is almost always younger with uncertainty.

Tectonic studies

Using detrital zircon age abundance 
In a global scale, detrital zircon age abundance can be used as a tool to infer significant tectonic events in the past. In Earth's history, the abundance of magmatic age peaks during periods of supercontinent assembly. This is because supercontinent provides a major crustal envelop selectively preserve the felsic magmatic rocks, resulting from partial melts. Thus, many detrital zircons originate from these igneous provence, resulting similar age peak records. For instance, the peak at about 0.6–0.7 Ga and 2.7 Ga (Figure 6) may correlate the break-up of Rodinia and supercontinent Kenorland respectively.

Using difference between detrital zircons crystallisation ages and their corresponding maximum depositional age 
Apart from the detrital zircon age abundance, difference between detrital zircons crystallisation ages (CA) and their corresponding maximum depositional age (DA) can be plotted in cumulative distribution function to correlate particular tectonic regime in the past. The effect of different tectonic settings on the difference between CA and DA is illustrated in Figure 7 and summarized in Table. 3.

References 

Sediments
Geochronological dating methods
Zircon